Phyllonorycter salicicolella is a moth of the family Gracillariidae. It is known from all of Europe (except the Balkan Peninsula), east to Russia and Japan.

The wingspan is 7–9 mm. It differs from L.viminetorum as follows: forewings more golden-ochreous, dorsal antemedian spot not reaching basal streak, hindwings rather lighter; the larva whitish-green; dorsal line green.

There are two generations per year with adults on wing in May and again in July and August.

The larvae feed on Salix aurita, Salix caprea, Salix cinerea and Salix myrsinifolia. They mine the leaves of their host plant. They create a small, lower-surface, tentiform mine, often touching the leaf margin. Pupation takes place in a flimsy, whitish or pale yellowish cocoon within the mine. The frass is deposited in a corner of the mine.

References

salicicolella
Moths of Asia
Moths of Europe
Moths described in 1848